was a town located in Asakuchi District, Okayama Prefecture, Japan.

As of 2003, Funao had an estimated population of 7,393 and a density of 682.01 persons per km2. The total area of the town was 10.84 km2.

On August 1, 2005, Funao, along with the town of Mabi (from Kibi District), was merged into the expanded city of Kurashiki.

Dissolved municipalities of Okayama Prefecture